The Faculty of Education and Social Work (Māori: Te Kura Akoranga me Te Tauwhiro Tangata) is the educational faculty of the University of Auckland. It was created in September 2004 through the merger of the University of Auckland and the Auckland College of Education. Since 2018, the Faculty has been headed by Dean Mark Barrow.

History
The Faculty of Education was established in 1 September 2004 through a merger of the University of Auckland's School of Education and the Auckland College of Education. The Auckland College of Education had been established in 1881 to provide teacher training in the Auckland region. In 1977, the University of Auckland had established its own School of Education to compete with the Auckland College after the New Zealand Government relaxed its policy on teacher training providers. The Faculty of Education's first Dean was Dr John Langley, who had previously headed the College of Education. In 2008, he was succeeded by Graeme Aitken, who served until late 2017. In 2015 the Faculty changed its name to Faculty of Education and Social Work to better reflect the research and qualifications offered. In 2018, Mark Barrow became the Dean of Education and Social Work.

On 30 September 2018, the Dean of Education Mark Barrow confirmed that the Faculty would be relocating from its Epsom campus to the University of Auckland's City Campus in 2020. An article in The New Zealand Herald noted there are plans to sell the site to the Māori tribe Ngāti Whātua.

In addition, a new education campus was established in Ōtara in partnership with the Manukau Institute of Technology in early 2020.

Later, the relocation of the Faculty of Education and Social Work from Epsom to the City Campus was postponed to late 2023, with teaching to resume at the refurbished Building 201 in 2024. The refurbished Building 201 will be funded through the Government's "shovel-ready" funding.

Locations and facilities
The Faculty of Education and Social Work's main campus is in Epsom, a suburb in central Auckland.

Courses and programs
The Faculty of Education and Social Work consists of five schools: the School of Counselling, Human Services and Social Work, the School of Critical Studies in Education, the School of Curriculum and Pedagogy,  School of Learning, Development and Professional Practice (LDPP), and the School of Māori and Indigenous Education (Te Puna Wānanga). Other associated institutions include the Centre for Learning and Research in Higher Education (CLEaR) and the Kohia Centre, which focuses on professional development for educators and social workers. The Faculty also offers a range of bachelor, graduate diploma, postgraduate diploma, MA, and PhD education programs at early childhood, primary, and secondary education levels.

Notes and references

Further reading

External links
Faculty of Education and Social Work homepage

2004 establishments in New Zealand
Colleges of education in New Zealand
Education in Auckland
Educational institutions established in 2004
Education, Faculty of